Jesse Castete (September 3, 1933 – August 29, 2014) was an American football defensive back. He played for the Chicago Bears in 1956 and for the Los Angeles Rams from 1956 to 1957.

He died on August 29, 2014, in Sulphur, Louisiana at age 80.

References

1933 births
2014 deaths
American football defensive backs
McNeese Cowboys football players
Chicago Bears players
Los Angeles Rams players